The Glasgow International Tournament was an invitational football tournament held at Ibrox Stadium Glasgow. The only edition took place between 1 and 2 August 1987. It was contested by four teams from different countries, including the host nation Scotland.

Results 

Internacional beat Rangers 5–4 on penalties.

References

External links 

Defunct international club association football competitions in Europe
International sports competitions in Glasgow
Scottish football friendly trophies
Defunct football cup competitions in Scotland
1987–88 in Scottish football
Football in Glasgow